Gulab Raghunath Patil (born 5 June 1966) is a politician and incumbent Water supply and Sanitation minister of the Maharashtra state. He is a Member of Legislative Assembly (MLA), the state's lower house representing rural Jalgaon constituency. He is a member of Shiv Sena party.

In 2019 he got elected in 14th legislative assembly. On 30 December 2019, he got appointed as Minister of Water supply and Sanitation in Eknath Shinde cabinet and also served as Guardian Minister of Jalgaon district. From 1999 to 2004 he represented Erandol constituency. 

In 2022 Gulab Patil resigned from minister post of Uddhav Thackeray's cabinet, left Shiv Sena and joined rebel leader Eknath Shinde during political crisis. Shinde with his more than 40 MLAs demanded break of alliance from Nationalist Congress Party–Indian National Congress and demanded Uddhav Thackeray to form government with Bharatiya Janata Party (BJP). It caused split in the party, at the end Shinde formed government with latter and became CM and Patil appointed as minister of Water supply and sanitation. In 2023 the faction took over Shiva Sena by the decision of Election Commission of India (ECI).

Positions held
 1999: Elected to Maharashtra Legislative Assembly
 2004: Re-elected to Maharashtra Legislative Assembly
 2009: Deputy Leader, Shiv Sena
 2014: Re-elected to Maharashtra Legislative Assembly (3rd term)
 2015: Aashwasan Samiti Pramukh Maharashtra Vidhan Mandal
 2016 - 2019: Minister of State for Co-operation in Maharashtra State Government
 2016 - 2019: Guardian minister of Parbhani (Maharashtra State)
 2019: Re-elected to Maharashtra Legislative Assembly (4th term)
2019: Cabinet Minister of Water Supply & Sanitation in Maharashtra State Government.
 2020: Appointed guardian minister of Jalgaon district

See also
 Uddhav Thackeray ministry
 Devendra Fadnavis ministry
 Jalgaon Lok Sabha constituency

References

External links
  Shivsena Home Page 

Members of the Maharashtra Legislative Council
Shiv Sena politicians
Maharashtra MLAs 1999–2004
Maharashtra MLAs 2004–2009
Maharashtra MLAs 2014–2019
People from Jalgaon district
Marathi politicians
Living people
1966 births